Galium ruwenzoriense is a member of the family Rubiaceae which grows at the mid-altitudes of 2,700 to 4,050 meters (8,900 – 13,300 ft) in Uganda, Kenya, Tanzania, Rwanda and Zaïre (Congo-Kinshasa or Democratic Republic of the Congo).

Galium ruwenzoriense forms vines, and spreads vegetatively by means of runners. It climbs, attaching to surfaces with rows of small hooks along the edges of its leaves and stems

It has bristly leaves, deep red or even black berries, and small, light green flowers.

References

ruwenzoriense
Flora of West-Central Tropical Africa
Flora of East Tropical Africa
Plants described in 1957